The New Hatay Stadium is a stadium in Antakya, Turkey. It was opened to public in 25 June 2021 with a capacity of 25,000 spectators. It is the new home of Hatayspor, currently playing in the Turkish Süper Lig. It has replaced the club's former home, Antakya Atatürk Stadium.

References

Football venues in Turkey
Sports venues completed in 2021
Sport venues in Hatay
Sport in Antakya